Culburra is a town and locality in the Australian state of South Australia. It is located on the Dukes Highway and Melbourne–Adelaide railway.

"Culburra" is an indigenous name meaning "plenty of sand", and the settlement was previously called Dewson before the name was changed in the early 20th century.

The boundaries and the name for the locality were gazetted on 24 August 2000. The locality consists of land adjoining the southern boundary of the cadastral unit of the Hundred of Coneybeer and land from the following hundreds – the north-east corner of Colebatch, the south-west corner of Lewis and a portion on its northern boundary of Richards.

At the 2006 census, Culburra had a population of 304. By the August 2016 census, this was reported to have fallen to only 77 people, however the area included as Culburra in the 2016 census was smaller so the numbers are not directly comparable.

Culburra is located within the federal division of Barker, the state electoral district of Mackillop and the local government area of the Coorong District Council.

References

Towns in South Australia